Voodoo Amplification is a Lansing, New York company which designs and modifies guitar amplifiers.

History
Trace Allen Davis first went into business in the mid 1990s with a small shop in Ithaca, New York, repairing and modifying production guitar amps with his own custom circuits. In time, his high-gain circuit mods became in such high demand by guitar players that production line amplifiers based on these custom circuits were released.

Voodoo Amps are hand-wired, point-to-point circuits. As such, their amps are often cited 
among those brands of high-end guitar amplifiers termed "boutique" amplifiers. The company backs their commitment to outstanding tone with rock-solid customer service.

Noted users of Voodoo's production amps and circuit mods are (according to the manufacturer) include Vivian Campbell and Phil Collen (of Def Leppard), Doug Aldrich (of Whitesnake), Michael Wilton (of Queensrÿche), Kip Winger, Jack Frost, Richard Fortus (of Guns N' Roses), Buz McGrath and Ken Susi (of Unearth) and famed producer Michael Wagener.

Current Models
Voodoo Amps currently produces a number of amplifiers which are a mix of modern- and vintage-inspired designs.  Most models are known for their variation on Voodoo's high-gain circuits.

V-Series

Voodoo's first entry into their "V-Series" was their V-Plex model. This amp was designed 
after the best sounding 1968 Marshall "Plexi" guitar amplifier that had come through their 
shop for repair.  Voodoo purchased the amp from its original owner, then reverse engineered the amp down to exact specs. The Voodoo V-Plex model is the result of those efforts. The amp has been very positively reviewed in  major guitar magazines, and is available in 50wt and 100wt head configurations, as well as a 25wt or 50wt 1x12 Combo.

The second entry into the V-Series was the V-Reck model.  The Voodoo V-Reck is a custom circuit amp that aims to capture the essence and vibe of the original Trainwreck amplifiers,  which were created by Ken Fisher in Colonia, New Jersey.  The V-Reck captures the essence of the original amps by allowing guitarists to go from shimmering clean tones to raging distortion — simply by manipulating the guitar's volume knob.  The V-Reck is available as a 50wt head or as a 50wt 1x12 Combo.

The third entry in this series was the V-Rock model.  The Voodoo V-Rock is a 100wt amplifier whose inspiration came from the original high-gain modification circuit designed by Jose Arredondo.  The V-Rock faithfully replicate the guitar tones of the top players of the 1980s, including John Sykes, George Lynch and Eddie Van Halen. The V-Rock is currently offered as a 100wt head, although a 50wt combo model may soon follow.

Hex series

Based upon one of Voodoo's original circuits, the Hex is a highly versatile 4-stage gain preamp with tremendous articulation, clarity and definition, even under the most extreme gain settings. It is a dual-channel design, which allows users to set up a clean/dirty arrangement, or two flavors of a distorted tone (rhythm/lead).  The Hex is available in 50wt and 100wt head configurations.

Baron Samedi series

With the Baron Samedi, Voodoo Amps proudly presents the ultimate high gain dual channel amp.  A 5-stage preamp offers a wide variety of available tones. An extensive equalisation circuit across two channels further enhances the flexibility of this amp.  The Witchdoctor is available in 50wt and 100wt head configurations, as well as a 10wt 1x12 combo.

CP-100 series

Next on the horizon is a 2nd model amp featuring a 5-stage preamp.  The CP-100 is 100wt head currently offered as a "rebuild" option on select production amplifier chassis, including the Marshall JCM 800 2205/2210 models, as well as the older Laney AOR Pro-Tube models with the wide chassis.  Voodoo Amps plans to have an official 2-channel production version of this amp available in late 2008/early 2009.

References

External links
 
 Guitar Player Magazine reviews the Voodoo V-Plex
 Guitar World Magazine reviews the Voodoo V-Plex
 Vintage Guitar Magazine reviews the Voodoo V-Plex
 Voodoo Amps Review at Harmony Central

Audio amplifier manufacturers
Guitar amplifier manufacturers
Audio equipment manufacturers of the United States